Bryan Barten (born October 8, 1973) is an American wheelchair tennis player, he is a three time US Open quads doubles finalist with Dylan Alcott and David Wagner. He has also competed at the Paralympic Games twice, reaching the quarterfinals at the 2012 Summer Paralympics in the quads singles.

References

External links
 
 

1973 births
Living people
People from Hart, Michigan
Sportspeople from Tucson, Arizona
Paralympic wheelchair tennis players of the United States
Wheelchair tennis players at the 2012 Summer Paralympics
Wheelchair tennis players at the 2016 Summer Paralympics
Medalists at the 2019 Parapan American Games
Tennis people from Michigan
University of Arizona alumni